A dry-sump system is a method to manage the lubricating motor oil in four-stroke and large two-stroke piston driven internal combustion engines. The dry-sump system uses two or more oil pumps and a separate oil reservoir, as opposed to a conventional wet-sump system, which uses only the main sump (U.S.: oil pan) below the engine and a single pump. A dry-sump engine requires a pressure relief valve to regulate negative pressure inside the engine, so internal seals are not inverted.

Dry-sumps are common on larger diesel engines such as those used in ships, as well as gasoline engines used in racing cars, aerobatic aircraft, high-performance personal watercraft and motorcycles. Dry sump lubrication may be chosen for these applications due to increased reliability, oil capacity, reduction of oil starvation under high g-loads and/or other technical or performance reasons. Dry sump systems may not be suitable for all applications due to increased cost, complexity, and/or bulk, among other factors.

Design 
Engines are both lubricated and cooled by oil that circulates throughout the engine, feeding various bearings and other moving parts and then draining, via gravity, into the sump at the base of the engine. In the wet-sump system of nearly all production automobile engines, the oil that's not actively circulating is stored in the sump, which is large enough for this purpose. A pump collects oil from the sump and directly circulates it back through the engine. In a dry-sump system, the oil still falls to the base of the engine, but into a much shallower sump, where one or more scavenge pumps draw it away and transfer it to a (usually external) reservoir, where it is both cooled and de-aerated before being recirculated through the engine by a pressure pump. The sump in a dry-sump system is not actually dry; it is still wet from oil draining from the engine. The reservoir is usually tall and narrow and specially designed with internal baffles, and an oil outlet (supply) at the very bottom for uninhibited oil supply even during sloshing.  

The dry pump operation consists of a pressure stage and a scavenging stage. Although the term "stages" is commonly used to describe the work of the multiple pumps, they typically run in parallel rather than in series as might be implied by the term. The pressure stage draws oil from the bottom of the reservoir and passes it through the filter and into the engine itself. An adjustable pressure regulator ensures that the oil pressure is kept stable at different engine speeds. The dry-sump system requires at least two pumps - one pressure and one scavenge - and sometimes as many as four or five scavenge pumps are used to minimize the amount of oil in the engine. The pressure pump and scavenge pumps are frequently mounted on a common crankshaft, so that a single pulley at the front of the system can run as many pumps as the engine design requires. It is common practice to have one scavenge pump per crankcase section; however, in the case of inverted engines (typically aircraft engines) it is necessary to employ separate scavenge pumps for each cylinder bank. Therefore, an inverted V engine would have a minimum of two scavenge pumps and a pressure pump in the pump stack.

Dry sump systems may optionally be designed to keep the engine's crankcase at lower than atmospheric pressure (vacuum), by sealing the crankcase and allowing the scavenge pumps to draw out both oil and gases. An equilibrium pressure will be reached when the rate of gases entering the crankcase (blow-by gases past the piston rings, but also air leaks and oil vapor) equals the rate of gas removal from the scavenge pump capacity beyond what's required to remove just the oil. Alternatively, the crankcase may be kept near atmospheric pressure by venting it to the oil reservoir, which in turn is vented into the engine's air intake, or to outside air.

Advantages
A dry-sump system offers many advantages over a wet-sump. The primary advantages include: 
 Prevention of the engine experiencing oil starvation during high g-loads when oil sloshes, which improves engine reliability. Most engines can be damaged by even brief periods of oil starvation. This is the reason why dry-sumps were invented, and is particularly valuable in racing cars, high performance sports cars, and aerobatic aircraft that regularly experience high accelerations. Oil slosh occurs in dry-sump systems too, but it is much easier to design a remote reservoir to tolerate high amounts of slosh, by being tall and narrow, and having large baffles.
 Increased oil capacity by using a large external reservoir, which would be impractical in a wet-sump system. 
 Improvements to vehicle handling and stability. The vehicle's center of gravity can be lowered by mounting the (typically very heavy) engine lower in the chassis due to a shallow sump profile. A vehicle's overall weight distribution can be modified by locating the external oil reservoir away from the engine. 
 Improved oil temperature control. This is due to increased oil volume providing resistance to heat saturation, the positioning of the oil reservoir away from the hot engine, and the ability to include cooling capabilities between the scavenger pumps and oil reservoir and also within the reservoir itself. 
 Improved oil quality. When oil sloshes against the crankshaft and other high-speed spinning parts, it causes a "hurricane that whips the oil in a wet-sump engine into an aerated froth like a milkshake in a blender". Aerated oil protects engine components far less effectively. A dry-sump system minimizes oil aeration, and also de-aerates oil far more effectively by pumping it first into a remote reservoir.
 Increased engine power. In a wet-sump engine, oil slosh against spinning parts causes substantial viscous drag which creates parasitic power loss. A dry-sump system removes oil from the crankcase, along with the possibility of such viscous drag. More complex dry-sump systems may scavenge oil from other areas where oil may pool, such as in the valvetrain. Power can be further increased if the dry-sump system is designed to create a vacuum inside the crankcase, which reduces air drag (or 'windage') on moving parts as well.
 Improved pump efficiency to maintain oil supply to the engine. Since scavenge pumps are typically mounted at the lowest point on the engine, the oil flows into the pump intake by gravity rather than having to be lifted up into the intake of the pump as in a wet-sump. Furthermore, scavenge pumps can be of a design that is more tolerant of entrapped gasses than the typical pressure pump, which can lose suction if too much air mixes into the oil. Since the pressure pump is typically lower than the external oil tank, it always has a positive pressure on its suction regardless of cornering forces.
 Having the pumps external to the engine makes them easier to maintain or replace.

Disadvantages
Dry-sump engines have several disadvantages compared to wet-sump engines, including;  
 Dry-sump systems add cost, complexity, and weight.
 The extra pumps and lines in dry-sump engines require additional oil and maintenance.
 The performance-enhancing features of dry-sump lubrication can hurt a car's day-to-day driveability. A good example is the classic Mercedes-Benz 300SL, a car that was designed for racing but sold to the general public and used on-road. The car had high oil capacity and a dry-sump system to cope with continuous high-speed running while racing. Owners found in general use, however, that the oil never achieved the correct operating temperature because the system was so effective at cooling the oil. A makeshift solution was devised to deliberately block the oil cooler airflow to boost the oil temperature.
 The large external reservoir and pumps can be tricky to position around the engine and within the engine bay due to their size.
 As wrist pins and pistons rely on the oil being splashed around in the crankcase for lubrication and cooling respectively, these parts might have inadequate oiling if too much oil is pulled away by the pump. Installing piston oilers can circumvent this issue, but do so with additional cost and complexity for the engine.
 Inadequate upper valvetrain lubrication can also become an issue if too much oil vapor is being pulled out from the area, especially with multi-staged pumps.

Common engine applications 
Dry-sumps are common on larger diesel engines such as those used for ship propulsion, largely due to increased reliability and serviceability. They are also commonly used in racing cars and aerobatic aircraft, due to problems with g-forces, reliable oil supply, power output and vehicle handling.  The Chevrolet Corvette Z06 has a dry sump engine which requires initial oil change after 500 miles.

Motorcycle engines 
The dry-sump lubrication is particularly applicable to motorcycles, which tend to be operated more vigorously than other road vehicles. Although motorcycles such as the Honda CB750 (1969) feature a dry-sump engine, modern motorcycles tend to use a wet-sump design. This is understandable with across-the-frame inline four-cylinder engines, since these wide engines must be mounted fairly high in the frame (for ground clearance), so the space below may as well be used for a wet-sump. However, narrower engines can be mounted lower and ideally should use dry-sump lubrication.

Several motorcycle models that use dry-sumps include;
 The classic British parallel twin motorcycles, such as BSA, Triumph and Norton, all used dry-sump lubrication. Traditionally, the oil tank was a remote item, but some late-model BSAs, and the Meriden Triumphs, used "oil-in-the-frame" designs. 
 The Triumph Rocket 3, an inline three-cylinder, water-cooled, DOHC engine.

 The Yamaha TRX850 270-degree parallel twin motorcycle has a dry-sump engine. Its oil reservoir is not remote, but integral to the engine, sitting atop the gearbox.  This design eliminates external oil lines, allowing simpler engine removal and providing faster oil warm up.
 The Yamaha XT660Z (and R/X models) use a dry-sump design where the bike's frame tubing is used as the oil reservoir and cooling system
 The Yamaha SR400/500 uses a dry-sump design where the bike's frame tubing doubles as the oil reservoir and cooling system.
 Harley-Davidson has used dry-sump type lubricating oil systems in their engines since the 1930s.
 The Rotax engined Aprilia RSV Mille, and the Aprilia RST1000 Futura both incorporate a dry-sump, along with sister bikes, the SL1000 Falco and ETV1000 Caponord.
 All BMW K-series motorcycles with inline-4 engines.
 The Honda NX650, XR500R, XR600R, XR650R and XR650L four-stroke dirt bikes utilize a dry-sump with the oil in the frame tubing.
 The Suzuki DR-Z400 has a 2L dry-sump with oil in the frame tubing.
 Chennai built Royal Enfield prior to 2007.  Royal Enfield dry sump designs were completely phased out by 2012.

See also 
 Wet sump

References

External links 

 
 
 

Engine lubrication systems
Engine technology